Thaliades was a town in Arcadian Azania in ancient Greece, situated on the river Ladon between the towns Halus and Thelpusa. There was a temple of Eleusinian Demeter, with statues of Demeter, her daughter and Dionysos. It was part of the city-state of Kleitor.
The ruins that have been found 1 km west of Vachlia are believed to be the remains of Thaliades.

References

Populated places in ancient Arcadia
Cities in ancient Peloponnese
Arcadian Azania
Former populated places in Greece